Haiqal Pashia Anugrah (born 29 November 1998) is a Singaporean professional footballer who plays for Singapore Premier League club Lion City Sailors.

Club career

Young Lions
In 1989 Haiqal made his professional football debut after signing for the Young Lions for the 2017 S.League season. He played his first match in the league against Home United where he came off the bench in the 64th minute in the 6-1 loss. On 14 October, Haiqal scored his first goal of the season and career in the eventual 45-0 win against Warriors FC.

International career

Youth
While representing the under-19 at the 2016 AFF U-19 Youth Championship, Haiqal scored the winner against Philippines.

Senior
Haiqal was first called up to the national team one day before the friendly against Fiji on 11 September 2018 as a replacement for the injured Iqbal Hussain.

Career statistics

Club

Personal life
Haiqal Pashia brother, Rezza Rezky also played in the Singapore Premier League.  Both were called up to the 2019 Merlion Cup.

Honours

International
Singapore U22
 Merlion Cup: 2019

References

Living people
1998 births
Singaporean footballers
Singapore international footballers
Singapore youth international footballers
Association football midfielders
Young Lions FC players
Lion City Sailors FC players
Singapore Premier League players
Competitors at the 2017 Southeast Asian Games
Competitors at the 2019 Southeast Asian Games
Southeast Asian Games competitors for Singapore